Georgia Brown may refer to:

People
Georgia Brown, married name of Tiny Broadwick (1893–1978), first woman to parachute from an airplane and inventor of the ripcord
Georgia Brown (English singer) (1933–1992), actress and singer
Georgia Brown (Brazilian singer) (born 1980), Guinness World Records holder for singing the highest recorded vocal note
Georgia-Rose Brown (born 1995), Australian artistic gymnast

Fictional characters
Georgia Brown, a fictional character from Broadway play and film Cabin in the Sky
Georgia Brown, a recurring character of the Australian television series Neighbours

See also
"Sweet Georgia Brown", a 1920s jazz song
"Sweet Georgia Brown", a song from the 2010 album Daughters by Daughters

Brown, Georgia